Porcellidiidae is a family of copepods belonging to the order Harpacticoida.

Genera

Genera:
 Acutiramus Harris & Robertson, 1994
 Brevifrons Harris, 1994
 Cereudorsum Harris, 2014

References

Copepods